Phyllonorycter argentinotella is a moth of the family Gracillariidae. It is known from Québec in Canada and Illinois, Kentucky, Pennsylvania, New York, Vermont, Connecticut and Massachusetts in the United States.

The wingspan is 6.5–8 mm.

The larvae feed on Ulmus species, including Ulmus americana, Ulmus fulva and Ulmus rubra. They mine the leaves of their host plant. The mine has the form of a tentiform mine on the underside of the leaf. The pupa is formed within a transparent silken web, occupying half the mine.

References

External links
Phyllonorycter at microleps.org

argentinotella
Moths of North America
Moths described in 1859